Henry Chang-Yu Lee  (born 22 November 1938) is a Chinese-American forensic scientist. He is one of the world's foremost forensic scientists and founder of the Henry C. Lee Institute of Forensic Science, affiliated with the University of New Haven.

Early life and career
The eleventh of thirteen children, Lee was born in Rugao county, Jiangsu province, in China, and fled to Taiwan, Republic of China at the end of the Chinese Civil War in the late 1940s. His father, who was traveling separately from the rest of the family, perished when the passenger ship Taiping sank on 27 January 1949. Growing up fatherless, Lee never aspired to attend university; instead, he went on to graduate in 1960 from the Central Police College with a B.A. degree in Police Administration. (Central Police College is a "service academy" in Taiwan, and it is tuition-free, with a living stipend provided.) Lee then began his work with the Taipei Police Department, where he rose to the rank of captain at age 22, the youngest in Taiwanese history. He later emigrated to the United States with his wife in 1965.

In 1972, after coming to the United States to pursue his education, he earned a B.S. in forensic science from John Jay College of Criminal Justice in New York City. He went on to study science and biochemistry at New York University and earned his M.S. in 1974 and Ph.D. in biochemistry in 1975.

Career

Current career
Lee is currently the director of Forensic Research and Training Center at the Henry C. Lee Institute of Forensic Science and Distinguished Chair Professor in Forensic Science at the University of New Haven. Lee was the Chief Emeritus for the Connecticut State Police during 2000 to 2010 and was the Commissioner of Public Safety for the State of Connecticut during 1998 to 2000 and has served as that state's Chief Criminalist and Director of State Police Forensic laboratory from 1978 to 2000.

Lee has lectured widely, written hundreds of articles published in professional journals, and authored or co-authored more than 40 books on forensic science, crime scene investigation and crime scene reconstruction. He has acted as an advisor or consultant to many law enforcement agencies. He hosted a show on the truTV network, formerly Court TV, titled Trace Evidence: The Case Files of Dr. Henry Lee, which highlighted his work on well-known cases. Lee has also appeared widely on television. He has been a guest on various Chinese TV and online programs, such as KangXi Lai Le in Taiwan, and multiple joining in Voice and Beyond the Edge in China Central Television in Mainland China.

His biography True Crime Experiences with Dr. Henry Chang-Yu Lee (神探李昌鈺破案實錄) was authored by Attorney Daniel Hong Deng of Rosemead, California, United States.

Famous cases

He has worked on famous cases such as the JonBenét Ramsey murder case, the Helle Crafts woodchipper murder (the first murder conviction in Connecticut without the victim's body), the O. J. Simpson and Laci Peterson cases, the post-9/11 forensic investigation, the Washington, DC sniper shootings and reinvestigated the assassination of John F. Kennedy.

Lee investigated the 3-19 shooting incident of President Chen Shui-bian and Vice President Annette Lu.

Following the O. J. Simpson case, Independent Counsel Kenneth Starr hired Lee to join his investigation of the death of Deputy White House Counsel Vincent Foster, who killed himself in Fort Marcy Park on July 20, 1993.

He also was consulted on the 1991 death of investigative journalist Danny Casolaro, who died in a West Virginia motel room. Initially, Lee said the evidence presented to him by police was not inconsistent with suicide. A few years later when additional evidence from the hotel scene was revealed to him, Lee formally withdrew his earlier conclusion and stated: "a reconstruction is only as good as the information supplied by the police.”

Lee was consulted as a blood spatter analyst during the trial of Michael Peterson, a fiction writer and politician from North Carolina who, in 2003, was convicted of the murder of his wife, Kathleen Peterson.

In 2007, Lee testified as a prosecution expert witness at the first trial of Cal Harris, an upstate New York car dealer accused of killing his wife on the night of September 11, 2001. Since no body has ever been found, the state's best evidence of foul play was some medium-velocity castoff impact blood spatter on the walls of the house's garage and kitchen. Harris was convicted at that trial, and a retrial after new evidence emerged, but ultimately acquitted at a fourth trial after his conviction was overturned on appeal.

In 2008, Lee was involved in the early stages of investigation in Orlando, Florida for missing toddler Caylee Anthony.

Phil Spector trial
In May 2007, Superior Court Judge Larry Paul Fidler, the judge in the Phil Spector murder trial, said that he had concluded "Lee hid or destroyed" a piece of evidence from the scene of actress Lana Clarkson's shooting. Lee denied the allegation, and "when he testified before Fidler, Lee said he was astonished and insulted by claims by two former members of Spector's defense team that he had collected a small white object that was never turned over to prosecutors, as the law requires." University of Southern California law professor Jean Rosenbluth said that Judge Fidler's ruling was  "very narrow" and noted that the judge had made no finding that Lee had lied on the stand or acted maliciously.

Allegations of error in 2019
In June 2019, the Connecticut Supreme Court concluded that Lee had erred in murder-trial testimony; Lee said a towel tested positive for blood, but he had not tested it all. Later tests found no blood. The Daily Beast later questioned additional cases in which Lee had testified.  Lee later claimed that he did test the towel at a press conference on June 17.  He said chemical screening tests for blood were done at the crime scene on the date of the homicide.

Personal life
Lee currently resides in Connecticut, where he lived with his wife Margaret Lee (April 16, 1939 – August 1, 2017), whom he married in 1962, until her death on August 1, 2017. His wife worked as a teacher and then a researcher for the United States Department of Veterans Affairs Medical Center in West Haven, Connecticut.

Lee remarried on December 1, 2018 to Xiaping Jiang, CEO of Jiadi (Hong Kong) Co., Yangzhou Jiadi Clothing Co., Ltd, and Yangzhou Jiadi Senior Care Center.

References

External links

Official website of the Henry C. Lee Institute of Forensic Science at the University of New Haven

1938 births
Living people
American forensic scientists
John Jay College of Criminal Justice alumni
Members of Committee of 100
New York University alumni
O. J. Simpson murder case
Scientists from Nantong
State cabinet secretaries of Connecticut
Taiwanese emigrants to the United States
University of New Haven faculty
Central Connecticut State University faculty
Central Police University alumni
Chinese Civil War refugees
American people of Chinese descent
Taiwanese people from Jiangsu
Taiwanese police officers